The 1988 Brown Bears football team was an American football team that represented Brown University during the 1988 NCAA Division I-AA football season. Brown went winless and finished last in the Ivy League. 

In their fifth season under head coach John Rosenberg, the Bears compiled an 0–9–1 record and were outscored 285 to 125. Greg Kylish, George Pyne and L. Wood were the team captains. 

The Bears' 0–6–1 conference record placed last in the Ivy League standings. They were outscored 196 to 91 by Ivy opponents. 

Brown played its home games at Brown Stadium in Providence, Rhode Island.

Schedule

References

Brown
Brown Bears football seasons
Brown Bears football